Tie Yinghua is a Chinese  kickboxer who competes in the Wu Lin Feng and Glory of Heroes organizations. As of July 2019, he is ranked the #10 featherweight in the world by Combat Press.

Championships and awards 
Wu Lin Feng
 2012 Wu Lin Feng 65 kg Champion
 2013 Wu Lin Feng 65 kg Champion
 2013 Wu Lin Feng 4-man Asia tournament runner-up
 2015 Wu Lin Feng 67 kg Champion
 2021 Wu Lin Feng Knockout of the Year (vs Liu Yaning)
Glory of Heroes
 2018 Glory of Heroes 67 kg Champion

Fight record

|-  style="background:#fbb;"
| 2022-12-09 || Loss || align=left| Vladimir Shuliak || Wu Lin Feng 532  || Zhengzhou, China || TKO (Corner stoppage)|| 3 ||

|-  style="background:#cfc;"
| 2021-09-25 || Win || align=left| Wei Ninghui|| Wu Lin Feng 2021: WLF in Tangshan  || Tangshan, China ||  Decision (Unanimous)|| 3 ||3:00

|-  style="text-align:center; background:#cfc;"
| 2021-07-03 || Win|| align=left| Xu Jian || Wu Lin Feng 2021: World Contender League 5th Stage || Zhengzhou, China || Decision (Unanimous) || 3 ||3:00

|-  style="text-align:center; background:#fbb;"
| 2021-01-23 || Loss|| align=left| Wang Pengfei || Wu Lin Feng 2021: Global Kung Fu Festival, Semi Final || Macao, China || Decision (Unanimous) || 3||3:00

|-  style="text-align:center; background:#cfc;"
| 2021-01-23 || Win|| align=left| Liu Yaning || Wu Lin Feng 2021: Global Kung Fu Festival, Quarter Final || Macao, China || TKO (2 Knockdowns/Spinning wheel kick)  || 2||

|-  style="text-align:center; background:#cfc;"
| 2020-10-18 || Win || align=left| Liu Yaning|| Wu Lin Feng 2020: King's Super Cup Final || Zhengzhou, China || Decision || 3 || 3:00

|- style="text-align:center; background:#cfc;"
| 2020-01-04 ||Win ||align=left| Sawettapong || Glory of Heroes 45|| Haikou, China || Decision || 3 || 3:00

|- style="text-align:center; background:#cfc;"
| 2019-09-29 ||Win ||align=left| Georgios Koulalis || Glory of Heroes 41|| China || KO (Left Knee to the Body) || 1 || 2:24

|-style="text-align:center; background:#CCFFCC;"
| 2019-06-22 ||Win ||align=left| Kwangtung Sasiprapa || Glory of Heroes 39 || Xinyi, Guangdong, China || Decision || 3 || 3:00

|-style="text-align:center; background:#CCFFCC;"
| 2019-05-25 ||Win ||align=left| Fran Valderrama || Glory of Heroes 38: Shantou || Shantou, China || Decision || 3 || 3:00

|-style="text-align:center; background:#CCFFCC;"
| 2018-09-15 ||Win ||align=left| Singsuriya Sakchaichot || Glory of Heroes 34: Tongling || Anhui, China || KO || 3 ||

|-style="text-align:center; background:#FFBBBB;"
| 2018-07-07 ||Loss ||align=left| Riki Matsuoka || Glory of Heroes 32: Huizhou || Guangdong, China || Decision|| 3 ||3:00

|-style="text-align:center; background:#CCFFCC;"
| 2018-05-26 ||Win ||align=left| Singdam Kiatmuu9 || Glory of Heroes 31 || Beijing, China ||KO (Spinning Hook Kick) ||1 ||

|-  style="text-align:center; background:#CCFFCC;"
| 2018-02-03 || Win ||align=left| Gabriel Varga || Glory of Heroes: Chengdu|| Chengdu, China || Decision (Unanimous) || 3 || 3:00

|-  style="text-align:center; background:#CCFFCC;"
| 2018-01-13 || Win ||align=left| Mohamed Hendouf || Glory of Heroes: Guangzhou|| Guangzhou, China || Extra Round Decision || 4 || 3:00
|-
! style=background:white colspan=9|

|-  style="text-align:center; background:#CCFFCC;"
| 2018-01-06 || Win ||align=left| Iquezang Kor.Rungthanakeat || Glory of Heroes: Chengdu|| Chengdu, China || TKO (Knee) || 1 ||

|-  style="text-align:center; background:#CCFFCC;"
| 2017-07-16|| Win ||align=left| Daiki Watabe || Glory of Heroes & Krush.77 || Nanning, China  || Decision || 3 || 3:00

|-  style="text-align:center; background:#CCFFCC;"
| 2017-06-16|| Win ||align=left| Zoomi Latif || Glory of Heroes: Shangyu || Shangyu District, China  || KO (Punches) || 2 ||

|-  style="text-align:center; background:#CCFFCC;"
| 2017-05-20|| Win ||align=left| Adonai Mederos || Glory of Heroes: Spain & Strikers League || Tenerife, Spain  || Decision (Unanimous) || 3 || 3:00

|-  style="text-align:center; background:#FFBBBB;"
| 2017-03-25|| Loss ||align=left| Korser Sergei || Rise of Heroes: Hengyang || Hengyang, China  || TKO (Doctor Stoppage) || 3 ||

|-  style="text-align:center; background:#CCFFCC;"
| 2017-01-13|| Win ||align=left| Makyol Yurk || Glory of Heroes 6 || Jiyuan, China  || Decision (Unanimous) || 3 || 3:00

|-  style="text-align:center; background:#FFBBBB;"
| 2016-12-17|| Loss ||align=left| Muhammad Khanov || Rise of Heroes 5 || Nanning, China  || Decision (Split) || 3 || 3:00

|-  style="text-align:center; background:#CCFFCC;"
| 2016-10-29|| Win ||align=left| Tepthanee Winai || Rise of Heroes 3 || Changji, China  || Decision|| 3 || 3:00

|-  style="text-align:center; background:#CCFFCC;"
| 2016-08-06|| Win ||align=left| Youssef Assouik || Glory of Heroes 4 || Changzhi, China  || Decision|| 3 || 3:00

|-  style="text-align:center; background:#CCFFCC;"
| 2016-07-02 || Win ||align=left| Dmitry Varats || Glory of Heroes 3  || Jiyuan, China || Extra Round Decision || 4 || 3:00

|-  style="text-align:center; background:#FFBBBB;"
| 2016-05-07|| Loss ||align=left| Kem Sitsongpeenong || Glory of Heroes 2 || Shenzhen, China  || Decision|| 3 || 3:00

|-  style="text-align:center; background:#CCFFCC;"
| 2016-04-02 || Win ||align=left| Fabio Pinca || Glory of Heroes 1 || Shenzhen, China || Decision (split) || 3 || 3:00

|-  style="text-align:center; background:#CCFFCC;"
| 2015-11-13 || Win ||align=left| Jo Sittisak || WCK vs Wu lin feng - USA vs China || China || TKO  || 1 ||

|-  style="text-align:center; background:#CCFFCC;"
| 2015-09-12 || Win ||align=left| Nobuyuki Hoshino || Wu Lin Feng || China || KO (Spinning back kick)  || 2 ||

|-  style="text-align:center; background:#FFBBBB;"
| 2015-06-06 || Loss ||align=left| Andrei Kulebin || Wu Lin Feng World Championship 2015 – 67 kg Tournament, Quarter Finals || Jiyuan, China || Decision || 3 || 3:00

|-  style="text-align:center; background:#CCFFCC;"
| 2015-06-06 || Win ||align=left| Kohei Nishikawa || Wu Lin Feng World Championship 2015 – 67 kg Tournament, First Round || Jiyuan, China || Decision || 3 || 3:00

|-  style="text-align:center; background:#CCFFCC;"
| 2015-01-31 || Win ||align=left| Khayal Dzhaniev || 2015 WLF World Championship, Final || Chongqing, China || Deision (Unanimous) || 3 || 3:00 
|-
! style=background:white colspan=9|

|-  style="text-align:center; background:#CCFFCC;"
| 2015-01-31 || Win ||align=left| Kim Dong Su || 2015 WLF World Championship, Semi Final || Chongqing, China || KO (Spinning back fist) || 1 || 2:40 
|-
|-  style="text-align:center; background:#CCFFCC;"
| 2015-01-31 || Win ||align=left| Shane Oblonsky || 2015 WLF World Championship, Quarter Final || Chongqing, China || Deision (Unanimous) || 3 || 3:00 
|-
|-  style="text-align:center; background:#CCFFCC;"
| 2014-12-27 || Win||align=left| Sucham || Wu Lin Feng ||Pingdingshan, China || Decision (Unanimous) || 3 || 03:00 
|-
|-  style="text-align:center; background:#CCFFCC;"
| 2014-12-19 || Win||align=left| Anjapa Sukunlu || Wu Lin Feng || Weinan, China || Decision (Unanimous) || 3 || 3:00 
|-
|- align="center"  bgcolor="#CCFFCC"
| 2014-11-21 || Win||align=left| Atu Sulanski || Wu Lin Feng || Xiaogan, China || Decision (Unanimous) || 3 || 3:00 
|-
|- align="center"  bgcolor="#CCFFCC"
| 2014-11-16 || Win||align=left| Kevin Miluka || Wu Lin Feng || Changsha, China || KO (High Kick) || 2 || 1:59 
|-
|- align="center"  bgcolor="#CCFFCC"
| 2014-10-04 || Win||align=left| Wade || Wu Lin Feng || Wenling, China || Decision (Unanimous) || 3 || 3:00            
|-
|- align="center"  bgcolor="#CCFFCC"
| 2014-09-07 || Win ||align=left| Felipe || Wu Lin Feng ||Karamay, China || Decision (Unanimous) || 3 || 3:00 
|-
|- align="center"  bgcolor="#FFBBBB"
| 2014-08-30 || Loss||align=left| Yang Zhuo || Wu Lin Feng - 67 kg World Tournament Final || Hong Kong || Extra Round Decision || 4 || 3:00
|-
! style=background:white colspan=9|

|- align="center"  bgcolor="#CCFFCC"
| 2014-08-30 || Win||align=left| Samuel || Wu Lin Feng - 67 kg World Tournament Semi final || Hong Kong || Decision (Unanimous) || 3 || 3:00 
|-
|- align="center"  bgcolor="#FFBBBB"
| 2014-07-18 || Loss||align=left| Noppagao || Wu Lin Feng || Dingyuan County, China || TKO (cut) || 1 ||  
|-
|- align="center"  bgcolor="#CCFFCC"
| 2014-06-14 || Win||align=left| JJ Power || Wu Lin Feng || Dublin, Ireland || TKO (Punch and Knee) || 2 || 1:55 
|-
|- align="center"  bgcolor="#CCFFCC"
| 2014-05-23 || Win||align=left| Mishima || Wu Lin Feng || Luoyang, China || TKO (Knee) || 2 || 1:20 
|-
|- align="center"  bgcolor="#CCFFCC"
| 2014-05-10 || Win||align=left| Tom Minners || Wu Lin Feng - Germany || Hamburg, Germany || Decision (Unanimous) || 3 || 3:00 
|-
|- align="center"  bgcolor="#FFBBBB"
| 2014-02-16 || Loss||align=left| Jomthong Chuwattana || MAX Muay Thai 6 || Zhengzhou, China || Decision (Unanimous) || 3 || 3:00 
|-
|- align="center"  bgcolor="#CCFFCC"
| 2014-01-18 || Win||align=left| Kim Dong Su || 2014 Wu Lin Feng World Kung Fu Festival || Xiangyang, China || Decision (Unanimous) || 3 || 3:00 
|-
|- align="center"  bgcolor="#CCFFCC"
| 2013-11-27 || Win||align=left| Sandberg || Wu Lin Feng || Anyang, China || TKO (Knee) || 2 || 2:35 
|-
|- align="center"  bgcolor="#CCFFCC"
| 2013-11-22 || Win||align=left| Valdet Gashi || Wu Lin Feng || Langfang, China || Decision || 3 || 3:00 
|-
|- align="center"  bgcolor="#CCFFCC"
| 2013-11-02 || Win||align=left| Mohammad Navidini || Wu Lin Feng - Las Vegas V || Las Vegas, United States || TKO (Punch) || 3 || 2:25 
|-
|- align="center"  bgcolor="#FFBBBB"
| 2013-08-30 || Loss||align=left| Michael Krcmar || Wu Lin Feng - New Zealand IV || Auckland, New Zealand || Decision || 3 || 3:00 
|-
|- align="center"  bgcolor="#CCFFCC"
| 2013-08-10 || Win||align=left| Petchtanong Banchamek || MAX Muay Thai 3 || Zhengzhou, China || Decision || 3 || 3:00 
|-
|- align="center"  bgcolor="#CCFFCC"
| 2013-04-25 || Win||align=left| Gu Hui || Wu Lin Feng - Asia 65 kg Championship, Final || Zhengzhou, China || Decision || 3 || 3:00 
|-
! style=background:white colspan=9|

|- align="center"  bgcolor="#CCFFCC"
| 2013-04-25 || Win||align=left| Chukai || Wu Lin Feng - 65 kg Asia  Championship, Semi Final || Zhengzhou, China || Decision || 3 || 3:00 
|-
|- align="center"  bgcolor="#CCFFCC"
| 2013-03-31 || Win||align=left| Andre Luis || Wu Lin Feng || Zhejiang, China || Decision || 3 || 3:00 
|-
|- align="center"  bgcolor="#FFBBBB"
| 2013-03-09 || Loss||align=left| Xie Lei ||  Wu Lin Feng - Malaysia ||Malaysia || Decision || 3 || 3:00 
|-
|- align="center"  bgcolor="#CCFFCC"
| 2013-03-09 || Win||align=left| Ediey Selendang Kuning || Wu Lin Feng - Malaysia || Malaysia || KO (High Kick) || 3 || 2:21 
|-
|- align="center"  bgcolor="#CCFFCC"
| 2013-03-01 || Win||align=left| 卓玛 || Wu Lin Feng || Wu'an, China || TKO (Low kick) || 2 || 0:45 
|-
|- align="center"  bgcolor="#CCFFCC"
| 2012-11-11 || Win||align=left| Artem Sharoshkin || Wu Lin Feng III || Las Vegas, United States || Decision || 3 || 3:00 
|-
|- align="center"  bgcolor="#CCFFCC"
| 2012-09-25 || Win||align=left| Miles || 2012 广源国际世界王者争霸赛 || Hefei, China || KO (Punch) || 1 || 0:40 
|-
|- align="center"  bgcolor="#CCFFCC"
| 2012-07-21 || Win||align=left| Hayden Todd || Wu Lin Feng - New Zealand II || Auckland, New Zealand || Decision || 3 || 3:00 
|-
|- align="center"  bgcolor="#CCFFCC"
| 2012-06-23 || Win||align=left| Changpuak Jetsada Pongtong || Wu Lin Feng || Foshan, China || Decision || 3 || 3:00

|-
|- align="center"  bgcolor="#CCFFCC"
| 2012-03-31 || Win||align=left| Sho Ogawa || Wu Lin Feng - Japan vs China || Zhengzhou, China || Extra Round Decision || 4 || 3:00 
|-
|- align="center"  bgcolor="#CCFFCC"
| 2012-02-20 || Win||align=left| Wang Yang || Wu Lin Feng || Zhengzhou, China || KO (High Kick) || 2 || 0:23 
|-
! style=background:white colspan=9|

|- align="center"  bgcolor="#CCFFCC"
| 2012-01-16 || Win||align=left| Liu Wei || Wu Lin Feng || Zhengzhou, China || Decision || 3 || 3:00 
|-
|- align="center"  bgcolor="#CCFFCC"
| 2012-01-14 || Win||align=left| Yin Hezhen || Wu Lin Feng - Hebi || Hebi, China || Decision || 3 || 3:00 
|-
|- align="center"  bgcolor="#CCFFCC"
| 2011-12-24 || Win||align=left| Gu Hui || Wu Lin Feng || Zhengzhou, China || Decision || 3 || 3:00 
|-
|- align="center"  bgcolor="#CCFFCC"
| 2011-11-12 || Win||align=left| Blake || Wu Lin Feng - New Zealand || Auckland, New Zealand || Decision || 3 || 3:00 
|-
|- align="center"  bgcolor="#CCFFCC"
| 2011-09-10 || Win||align=left| Doug Higgins || Wu Lin Feng - Malaysia || Kuala Lumpur, Malaysia || KO (Side kick) || 1 || 2:20 
|-
|- align="center"  bgcolor="#CCFFCC"
| 2011-06-18 || Win ||align=left| Yu Zezhou || WBC MuayThai China Championship || Nanning, China || KO (Punch) || 2 || 2:08 
|-
|- align="center"  bgcolor="#CCFFCC"
| 2011-04-16 || Win ||align=left| Zheng Zhaoyu || Wu Lin Feng || Zhengzhou, China || Decision || 3 || 3:00
|-
|- align="center"  bgcolor="#CCFFCC"
| 2011-04-02 || Win ||align=left| Xie Lei || Wu Lin Feng || Zhengzhou, China || Decision || 3 || 3:00 
|-
|- align="center"  bgcolor="#FFBBBB"
| 2011-01-15 || Loss ||align=left| Yang Wei || Wu Lin Feng || Zhengzhou, China || KO (Punch) || 2 || 2:15 
|-
|- align="center"  bgcolor="#FFBBBB"
| 2010-08-14 || Loss ||align=left| Zhao Feilong || Wu Lin Feng || Zhengzhou, China || Decision || 3 || 3:00

|-
| colspan=9 | Legend:    

|- align="center"  bgcolor="#FFBBBB"
| 2012-05-20 || Loss||align=left| Ding Ning || 2012 China Kickboxing Championships || Kaifeng, China || Decision || 3 || 3:00 
|-
|- align="center"  bgcolor="#CCFFCC"
| 2012-05-20 || Win||align=left| Wang Pengfei || 2012 China Kickboxing Championships || Kaifeng, China || Decision || 3 || 3:00 
|-
| colspan=9 | Legend:

Mixed martial arts record

|-
|Win
|align=center| 1–0
|Aliaksei krepets
|TKO
|Glory of Heroes 35: Meishan
|
|align=center| 2
|align=center| 1:38
|Sichuan, China
|

References 

Chinese male kickboxers
Featherweight kickboxers
1993 births
Living people
Sportspeople from Hubei
People from Jingmen